This article details the fixtures and results of the Armenia national football team in 2000s.

2000

2001

2002

2003

2004

2005

2006

2007

2008

2009

See also
 Armenia national football team results (1992–1999)
 Armenia national football team results (2010–2019)
 Armenia national football team results (2020–present)

References

2000
football team results
Foo
2001 in Armenian football
2002 in Armenian football
2003 in Armenian football
2004 in Armenian football
2005 in Armenian football
2006 in Armenian football
2007 in Armenian football
2008 in Armenian football
2009 in Armenian football